The 2003–04 Providence Friars men's basketball team represented Providence College in the Big East Conference. The team finished with an 11–5 conference record and a 20–9 record overall.

Coming off an 18–14 record and a second-round NIT loss in 2002–03, the team returned all five starters for coach Tim Welsh's sixth season with the Friars. However, forward Romuald Augustin transferred to Bryant College for his fifth year of eligibility, while walk-on guard Chris Burns also transferred to Bryant for his sophomore season. The team also lost two departing seniors, guard Kareem Hayletts and forward Stephen Traugott. On February 24, after playing in 12 games for the Friars, senior forward Māris Ļaksa left the team to play professional basketball in Slovenia.

The Friars began the season receiving votes in both polls, but not ranked in either. Following an 8–1 start that included a win over #14 Illinois, the Friars earned a #25 ranking in the AP Poll in time for their January 5 matchup with #18 Texas. The Friars took the Longhorns to overtime, but as time expired in the overtime period, Texas forward P. J. Tucker released a layup to give the Longhorns a two-point win. The controversial shot was reviewed for more than five minutes by the officials, who determined that the clock read "00.0" but the red backboard light had not yet gone on when the ball was released, which at the time overruled the clock.

Despite the close loss, the Friars re-emerged in the top 25 three weeks later, following a road win over #4 Connecticut. A six-game winning streak that began with a win over #18 Syracuse propelled the Friars to a #12 ranking in the AP Poll on March 1. This was followed by two home losses to close out the regular season, and a #3 seed in the 2004 Big East men's basketball tournament. Following a first-round bye, the Friars dropped a three-point game to Villanova in the quarterfinals, leading to a #5 seed in the NCAA tournament. In the first round, the Friars were defeated 66–58 by the #12 seed, Pacific. The Friars ended the season with a #21 ranking in the AP Poll.

The Friars were led in scoring (18.9 ppg) and rebounding (9.4 rpg) by junior forward Ryan Gomes. He became the fourth Friar to be named a First Team All-American by the Associated Press.

Roster

Depth chart

Incoming recruits

Schedule

|-
!colspan=9| Exhibition games

|-
!colspan=9| Non-conference games

|-
!colspan=9| Big East regular season

|-
!colspan=9| Big East tournament

|-
!colspan=9| NCAA tournament

Rankings

Awards and honors

References

External links
2003–04 Providence Friars men's basketball prospectus 

Providence Friars men's basketball seasons
Providence Friars
Providence
Providence
Providence